No. 11 Group is a group in the Royal Air Force first formed in 1918. It had been formed and disbanded for various periods during the 20th century before disbanding in 1996 and reforming again in 2018. Its most famous service was in 1940 in the Battle of Britain during the Second World War, when it defended London and the south-east of the United Kingdom from attacks by the German Luftwaffe. It was reformed in late 2018 as a "multi-domain operations group" to ensure the service thinks and acts in a networked way.

History

First World War
No. 11 Group was first formed on 1 April 1918 in No. 2 Area as No. 11 (Equipment) Group, and was transferred to South-Western Area the next month on 8 May. The Group was disbanded on 17 May 1918.

Inter-war years
The next incarnation of the Group occurred in 22 August 1918 when it was formed as part of the North-Western Area. On 6 February 1920, Group captain Ian Bonham-Carter took command and three months later, in May 1920, 11 Group was reduced in status to No. 11 Wing. The Group was reformed on 1 May 1936 as No. 11 (Fighter) Group by renaming Fighting Area. On 14 July 1936, 11 Group became the first RAF Fighter Command Group responsible for the air-defence of southern England, including London.

Second World War, 1939 to 1945
No.11 Group was organised with the Dowding System of fighter control. Group Headquarters was at Hillingdon House, located at RAF Uxbridge in the London Borough of Hillingdon. The Group operations room was underground in what is now known as the Battle of Britain Bunker. Commands were passed to the sector airfields, each of which was in charge of several airfields and fighter squadrons.  The sector airfields were:

Sector A: 
 RAF Tangmere (Sector HQ)
 RAF Westhampnett
Sector B:  
 RAF Kenley (Sector HQ)
 RAF Croydon
 RAF Redhill

Sector C: 
 RAF Biggin Hill (Sector HQ)
 RAF Hawkinge
 RAF Friston
Sector D:  
 RAF Hornchurch (Sector HQ)
 RAF Rochford
 RAF Manston

Sector E:  
 RAF North Weald (Sector HQ)
 RAF Stapleford Tawney
Sector F:  
 RAF Debden (Sector HQ)

Sector Y:  
 RAF Middle Wallop (Sector HQ)
 RAF Odiham
Sector Z:  
 RAF Northolt (Sector HQ)
 RAF Hendon

Battle of Britain 1940 
The most famous period of the Group was during the Battle of Britain when it bore the brunt of the German aerial assault. Pilots posted to squadrons in 11 Group knew that they would be in constant action, while pilots and squadrons transferred from No.11 Group knew that they were going to somewhere comparatively safer. During the Battle of Britain, the Group was commanded by New Zealander Air vice-marshal Keith Park. While supported by the commanders (AOCs) of No. 10 Group and No. 13 Group, he received insufficient support from the AOC of 12 Group, Air Vice Marshal Trafford Leigh-Mallory, who used the Big Wing controversy to criticise Park's tactics. Leigh-Mallory's lack of support compromised Fighter Command at a critical time and the controversy caused problems for Park. When the Battle of Britain was over, Leigh-Mallory, acting with Air marshal Sholto Douglas, conspired to have Park removed from his position (along with the Commander-in-Chief of Fighter Command, Air chief marshal Hugh Dowding). Leigh-Mallory then took over command of 11 Group.

Post-war
After the war in December 1951, No.11 Group consisted of the Southern and Metropolitan sectors. The Southern Sector included 1 Squadron and No. 29/22 Squadrons at RAF Tangmere and 54 Squadron and 247 (China-British) Squadron at RAF Odiham. The Metropolitan Sector had 25 Squadron at RAF West Malling, 41/253 Squadron at RAF Biggin Hill, 56/87 Squadron and 63 Squadron at RAF Waterbeach, 64 Squadron and 65 (East India) Squadron at RAF Duxford, 72 Squadron at RAF North Weald, 85/145 at RAF West Malling with Gloster Meteor NF.11s, and 257 (Burma) Squadron and 263 (Fellowship of the Bellows) Squadron at RAF Wattisham. Denoted by a '/', a short-lived RAF postwar scheme saw several squadrons linked, where two squadron numbers' heritage was carried on within one single unit.

In 1960 Fighter Command was re-organised and 11 Group was disbanded on 31 December 1960, to reform one day later when 13 Group was renamed 11 Group. On 1 April 1963, the Group was replaced by No. 11 (Northern) Sector at RAF Leconfield which controlled Fighter Command airfields and units within Northern England. On 17 March 1965 the sector absorbed No. 13 (Scotland) Sector RAF which was formed on 1 April 1963 at Boulmer and 11 Sector moved to Boulmer. This incarnation lasted until Fighter Command was absorbed into the new Strike Command on 30 April 1968 and became 11 Group. 11 Sector became Sector South and No. 12 Sector RAF was absorbed and became Sector North. Group Headquarters shifted to RAF Bentley Priory in north-west London and took responsibility for the UK Air Defence Region (UK ADR). The English Electric Lightning F.1 entered service in 1960 and the McDonnell Douglas Phantom FGR.2 in 1969, with 43 (China-British) Squadron at RAF Leuchars.

The group was renamed 11 (Air Defence) Group in January 1986. In the early 1990s, the front-line force consisted of 56 Squadron and 74 (Trinidad) Squadrons flying Phantoms from RAF Wattisham, 5 Squadron and 29 Squadron flying the Panavia Tornado F3 from RAF Coningsby, 11 Squadron, 23 Squadron, and 25 Squadron flying the Tornado F3 from RAF Leeming and  43 Squadron and 111 Squadron at RAF Leuchars; 8 Squadron flew Boeing E-3D Sentry AEW1 from RAF Waddington, 5 Squadron and 11 Squadron had been the last units flying the English Electric Lightning F.6 from RAF Binbrook until 1988; 25 Squadron and 85 Squadron had been operating Bristol Bloodhound surface-to-air missiles and re-equipped with the Tornado and disbanded in 1989 and on 10 July 1991 respectively. The Wattisham Phantom Wing was disbanded relatively quickly following the end of the Cold War; 23 Squadron was disbanded in March 1994.

On 9 January 1992, Sector's South and North combined. On 1 April 1996, 11 Group amalgamated with 18 Group to form 11/18 Group. Air Vice Marshal Anthony Bagnall, who took over on 15 July 1994, was the Group's last commander.

2018 reformation 

On 11 July 2018, Air Chief Marshal Sir Stephen Hillier announced at the Air Power Conference that 11 Group would reform as a "multi-domain operations group", to ensure the RAF thinks and acts in a networked way and combining air, space and cyber-warfare elements to create an integrated force. No increase in the number of senior officers or staff at headquarters was proposed as part of the reformation. The group reformed at a ceremony at RAF High Wycombe in Buckinghamshire on 1 November 2018, when Air Vice-Marshal Ian Duguid took command.

Role and operations 

No. 11 Group includes the capabilities of the Chief of Staff Operations and the Air Battle Staff, comprising the deployable Joint Force Air Component (JFAC), the National Air & Space Operations Centre (NASOC) and the Executive Team. The group also includes the RAF Battle Management Force. The Group is to ensure that the large amounts of data, intelligence and information contributes to the planning and execution of operations in the domains of air, space and cyber.

Stations 
No. 11 Group is based at the NASOC, located at RAF High Wycombe in Buckinghamshire. The group is also responsible for the following RAF stations.
 RAF Spadeadam, Cumbria – Home of the UK's Electronic Warfare Tactics Range.

List of group commanders 

1936 to 1963
 14 July 1936 Air Vice-Marshal Philip Joubert de la Ferté
 7 September 1936 Air Vice-Marshal Leslie Gossage
 January 1940 Air Vice-Marshal William Welsh
 20 April 1940 Air Vice-Marshal Keith Park
 18 December 1940 Air Vice-Marshal Trafford Leigh-Mallory
 28 November 1942 Air Vice-Marshal Hugh Saunders
 1 November 1944 Air Vice-Marshal John Cole-Hamilton
 20 July 1945 Air Vice-Marshal Dermot Boyle
 24 April 1946 Air Vice-Marshal S D Macdonald
 1 June 1948 Air Vice-Marshal Stanley Vincent
 9 January 1950 Air Vice-Marshal Thomas Pike
 5 July 1951 Air Vice-Marshal The Earl of Bandon
 1 November 1953 Air Vice-Marshal Hubert Patch
 16 January 1956 Air Vice-Marshal V S Bowling
 12 January 1959 Air Vice-Marshal Alick Foord-Kelcey
 1 January 1961 Air Vice-Marshal Harold Maguire
 13 January 1962 Air Vice-Marshal Gareth Clayton

1968 to 1996
 30 April 1968 Air Vice-Marshal R I Jones
 2 February 1970 Air Vice-Marshal Ivor Broom
 6 December 1972 Air Vice-Marshal Robert Freer
 15 March 1975 Air Vice-Marshal William Harbison
 14 March 1977 Air Vice-Marshal Donald Hall
 3 September 1977 Air Vice-Marshal Peter Latham
 7 January 1981 Air Vice-Marshal Peter Harding
 11 August 1982 Air Vice-Marshal Kenneth Hayr
 1 August 1985 Air Vice-Marshal Michael Stear
 15 July 1987 Air Vice-Marshal Roger Palin
 17 March 1989 Air Vice-Marshal Bill Wratten
 16 September 1991 Air Vice-Marshal John Allison
 15 July 1994 Air Vice-Marshal Anthony Bagnall

2018 to present
 1 October 2018 Air Vice-Marshal Ian Duguid
 1 December 2021 Air Vice-Marshal Philip Robinson

See also
 List of Battle of Britain airfields
 List of Battle of Britain squadrons

References
Notes

Bibliography

External links
 11 Group Website

011
No. 11
Royal Air Force groups of the Second World War
Military units and formations established in 1918
Military units and formations in Uxbridge
1918 establishments in the United Kingdom